First-seeded Jimmy Connors retained his title, defeating second-seeded Raúl Ramírez in the final.

Seeds

  Jimmy Connors (champion)
  Raúl Ramírez (final)
  Roscoe Tanner (first round)
  Adriano Panatta (first round)
  Ken Rosewall (second round)
  Mark Cox (first round)
  Stan Smith (quarterfinals)
  Bob Lutz (second round)
  Cliff Drysdale (second round)
  Jaime Fillol (quarterfinals)
  Cliff Richey (first round)
  John Alexander (quarterfinals)
  Phil Dent (first round)
  Bill Scanlon (second round)
  Brian Fairlie (first round)
  Vijay Amritraj (first round)

Draw

Finals

Top half

Bottom half

References
General

Specific

1977 Alan King Tennis Classic